Jonathan James Vaughters (born June 10, 1973) is an American former professional racing cyclist and current manager of UCI WorldTeam .

Racing career 
Vaughters started competitive cycling in the 1980s, racing in the Red Zinger Mini Classics youth cycling series in Colorado.

In 1997 he moved to John Wordin's Comptel Data team, entering races he described as "A thousand times easier than being in Europe." He had a successful season becoming US National Time Trial Champion, and was 3rd in the National Road Race. His successes led to him signing for U.S. Postal Service cycling team. In 1999, he won the time trial of the Dauphiné Libéré and finished 2nd overall to Alexandre Vinokourov after losing the general classification leadership on the final stage. He then went on to win the Route du Sud in preparation for the Tour de France as part of Lance Armstrong's team that went on to Armstrong's first win. In that Tour, he earned the nickname "El Gato" (The Cat in Spanish), having landed on his feet after being thrown headfirst over his handlebars in the first stage. In the second stage, he cut his chin in a crash and had to abandon the race.  This started his reputation as a somewhat innocent victim in a long series of ill-timed crashes, with an uncanny knack for being in the wrong place at the wrong time.

In 2000, Vaughters joined the French team Crédit Agricole. In the early part of the season he was third in the Tour Méditerranéen, sixth in Paris-Nice and in the Critérium International. In June, he was fifth in the Critérium du Dauphiné Libéré, after placing fourth in the stage including Mont Ventoux. In July, he participated in the Tour de France and abandoned during the tenth stage after a fall on the descent of the Col de Marie-Blanque. In 2001, he won the time trial in the Dauphiné Libéré, and the Duo Normand with teammate Jens Voigt. During the Tour de France, he was part of the winning team in the team time trial. He was again forced to retire from the Tour, however, suffering from a wasp sting above his right eye during the 14th stage  (the UCI prohibited the use of cortisone injected intramuscularly or intravenously for the treatment of wounds, although it could be directly injected, e.g. for tendonitis). In 2002, he participated in his fourth and final Tour de France as a rider but failed again to reach the end of the race. He abandoned at the eleventh stage after falling in the descent of the Col d'Aubisque. Following the abandonment, he requested and received the termination of his contract with Crédit Agricole which had been due to run until the end of 2003. He retired from racing, citing a desire to spend more time with his family.

After returning to America he signed in 2003 for the U.S. team Prime Alliance 2003. He ended his career as a cyclist at the end of that year.

Vaughters was a specialist climber and was touted as a Stage race specialist.  He won the Mont Ventoux stage of the Critérium du Dauphiné Libéré in 1999 and 2001, and held the record for the fastest ascent until it was broken by Iban Mayo in 2004.

Vaughters also holds the Cycle To The Sun record time of 2:38 set in 1992 for climbing Haleakala volcano on Maui, Hawaii. The record however has been unofficially beaten by Ryder Hesjedal in 2010, who climbed the volcano in 2:32.

Managerial career 
During 2003 Vaughters launched the new 5280/Subaru junior team originally based in Colorado. Recruitment was done by Vaughters and Prime Alliance director Roy Knickman with Colby Pearce as the head Sporting Director. In 2004, Vaughters took effective management of the team and in 2005 it was split between the  5280 junior team and the continental team TIAA-CREF.

In early 2005 Vaughters met Doug Ellis at the launch party for the new season. A computer engineer specializing in financial management software, Ellis was a huge fan of cycling since the 1980s. From 2006, the team became the property of sports management Slipstream Sports, chaired by Doug Ellis with a view to creating an American Pro-Tour team by 2009. In 2007, with the absence of a title sponsor, the team operated under the name Slipstream, and later Slipstream Sports – powered by Chipotle. A professional continental team in 2007 and a ProTour team in 2009 they participated for the first time in the Tour de France and Giro d'Italia in 2008. In February 2009, Jonathan Vaughters was elected president of the International Association of Professional Cycling Groups (AIGCP). Vaughters' Garmin-Cervélo squad took the top position in the team classification in the 2011 Tour de France.

Doping experience and reflections
Vaughters states that he used erythropoietin (EPO) for the purpose of blood doping during  1996–2000, through organized doping schemes on the Santa Clara and U.S. Postal racing teams. He also observed other forms of doping by U.S. Postal riders, and he independently doped using EPO during 2002, until reconsidering his ethical choices.
In August 2012, Vaughters published an opinion column in 'The New York Times' entitled 'How to Get Doping Out of Sports' in which he stated his opposition to doping and expressed his regret over taking drugs during his cycling career.

Major results

1995
 1st  Overall Tour of the Gila
 1st Stage 1
1997
 1st   United States National Time Trial Champion
 1st Mt. Evans Hill Climb
 1st Stage 2 Redlands Bicycle Classic
 1st  Overall Tour de Beauce
1st Stages 3 & 4
 1st  Overall Cascade Classic
1998
 1st  Overall Redlands Bicycle Classic
1st Stages 2 & 3
1999
 1st  Overall Route du Sud
 1st Mt. Evans Hill Climb
 1st Stage 4 Redlands Bicycle Classic
 2nd Overall Critérium du Dauphiné Libéré
1st Stage 3 (Mont Ventoux)
2000
 3rd Overall Tour Méditerranéen
2001
 1st Stage 5 TTT Tour de France
 1st Stage 4 Critérium du Dauphiné Libéré
 1st Duo Normand (with Jens Voigt)
2002
 1st Breckenridge
 1st Golden
2003
 1st Stage 2 Solano Bicycle Classic
 1st Mt. Evans Hill Climb

References

External links 

 Slipstream Sports

 VELOBIOS Slipstream Sports Team Profile
 
 2005 Pezcyclingnews interview of Jonathan Vaughters by Matt Wood

1973 births
American male cyclists
American sportspeople in doping cases
Doping cases in cycling
Living people
Sportspeople from Denver
EF Education–EasyPost
Cyclists from Colorado